Granata maculata is a species of small sea snail, a marine gastropod mollusk in the family Chilodontidae.

Description
The small, oval shell is inflated. It has a rounded prominent spire containing 4 whorls. It is very delicately striate longitudinally and transversely. It is pale yellow, marbled with brown and reddish brown. The columellar margin is flattened. The regularly oval aperture is nacreous and striate within. The operculum is very thin.

Distribution
This species occurs in the Pacific Ocean off Vanikoro and the Torres Strait.

References

External links

maculata
Gastropods described in 1834